Kelly Jeanette Baker (born August 1980) is an American writer.

Early life and education 
Baker was born in August 1980 in Marianna, Florida. She earned an Associate of Arts from Chipola College. Baker completed a Bachelor of Arts in American Studies at Florida State University (FSU). She earned a Master of Arts in American Religious History from FSU. Her 2003 master's thesis was titled Henry Ossawa Tanner: Race, Religion, and Visual Mysticism. Her advisor was John Corrigan. She completed her Doctorate of Philosophy in American religious history at FSU in 2008.

Career 
As a graduate student, Baker began writing for a public audience as a contributing editor at the nascent Religion in American History blog. From 2007 to 2009, she was a lecturer at University of New Mexico and Central New Mexico Community College where she taught religious studies and humanities. From 2010 to 2013, Baker was a lecturer of religious studies and an affiliated faculty member of American and global studies at University of Tennessee. She began her career as a freelance writer in 2013. In 2016, Baker started as the editor of Women in Higher Education.

Baker is a commentator on higher education, sexism, and religion and its intersections to race, class, gender, and violence.

Personal life 
Baker resides in Marianna, Florida with her husband and three cats, .

Selected works

Books

References

External links
 

Living people
20th-century American women writers
21st-century American women writers
1980 births
People from Marianna, Florida
Writers from Florida
American online publication editors
American women editors
Chipola College alumni
Florida State University alumni
University of Tennessee faculty
American women academics